The Amazing Praybeyt Benjamin is a 2014 Philippine comedy film written and directed by Wenn V. Deramas. It is the sequel to The Unkabogable Praybeyt Benjamin. The film is one of the official entries to the 40th Metro Manila Film Festival. Vice Ganda reprised his role as Colonel Benjamin "Benjie" Santos VIII together with a supporting cast Richard Yap, Tom Rodriguez, Bimby Yap and introducing Alex Gonzaga with the special participation of Eddie Garcia.

Plot 
On a mission in Paris, Praybeyt Benjamin and his platoon defeat a horde of zombies in a parody of Plants vs. Zombies, leading to his promotion to Colonel. To prepare him better, Benjamin is assigned under a new general, Wilson Chua (Richard Yap). However, Benjamin screws up a subsequent mission against terrorists led by Jan Jaranjan (Tom Rodriguez) and is narrowly rescued by his grandfather, who sacrifices himself to save him. Benjamin is about to be dismissed from service when Gen. Chua saves him by giving him a mission – to guard his bratty son Bimbee (Bimby Yap), who holds a clue to the location of the terrorists' next three bomb attacks. As he watches over Bimbee, Benjamin finds himself clashing with Misty (Rhed Bustamante), General Chua's daughter, and the meddlesome housemaid Gundina (Alex Gonzaga), while trying to gain information from a recalcitrant Bimby. However, as he gets to know Bimbee more, he learns that Bimbee is a kid deprived of love from family – something that he has ignored in his quest to be on top again. The first bomb explodes harmlessly while the second is found and defused by a Benjamin, who is fired shortly afterwards after his arrogance causes a screw-up. While relearning his humility with his family, the terrorists abduct Bimby and take him to their last target, a shopping mall. Benjamin is reinstated into the army, rescues Bimbu and defuses the bomb, after which he flies off with Bimby on an umbrella resembling that of Mary Poppins.

Cast of characters

Main cast
Vice Ganda as Colonel Benjamin "Ben G" Santos VIII

Supporting cast
Richard Yap as Commanding General Wilson Chua
Tom Rodriguez as Jan Jaranjan
Bimby Aquino Yap as Bimbee Pineda Chua
Alex Gonzaga as Gundina Galamiton
Al Tantay as Benjamin "Ben" Santos VII
Eddie Garcia as General Benjamin "Bino" Santos VI
Vandolph Quizon as Buhawi Manay
Nikki Valdez as Lucresia Alcantara
Kean Cipriano as Emerson Ecleo
Anja Aguilar as Jesamine Santos
DJ Durano as Dominador "Dondi" Rosales
Ricky Rivero as Big Boy Carnate
Dennis Padilla as Bentot Santos
Malou de Guzman as Lilibeth Santos
Abby Bautista as Anjemin Santos
Rhed Bustamante as Misty Chua
Gerard Garcia as Inspector Bautista
Kurt Ong as Inspector Realado
David Licauco as Terrorist
 Rubi Rubi as Captain Tenille
Atak Araña as Zak Apron

Cameo
Angel Locsin as young Lilibeth Santos
Kris Aquino as Krissy (Not to be confused as Krissy Achino)
Darla Sauler as Darla
Luis Manzano as young Benjamin "Ben" Santos VII
James Reid as James
Donnalyn Bartolome as herself

Reception

Box office 
MMDA Chairman Francis Tolentino, revealed that The Amazing Praybeyt Benjamin topped the box office record of the 40th Metro Manila Film Festival's opening day on December 25, 2014, in a radio interview in DZMM. Praybeyt Benjamin was ahead of fellow entrants, My Big Bossing's Adventures and Feng Shui 2 ranked second and third respectively in terms of box office record on the opening day of the film festival. Tolentino did not state the official figures of the sales on the opening day of the film festival during the said interview.

During her stint at The Buzz where is she is one of the hosts, Kris Aquino said that The Amazing Praybeyt Benjamin recorded P172 million worth of box office receipts as of 3:00 pm PST December 28, 2014.

In a January 15, 2015, episode of Vice Ganda's variety show, It's Showtime, he announced that the movie closed the day before with P435 million earnings, surpassing the film Starting Over Again in terms of domestic earnings. He now hold the distinction of starring in 7 of the 20 highest-grossing films in the Philippines of all time.

Critical response 
Despite being a high-grossing film at the 40th Metro Manila Film Festival, reception for The Amazing Praybeyt Benjamin generally received negative reviews.

Zig Marasigan of Rappler, described the film in his movie review as "a brainless, hyper-stylized and utterly ridiculous family comedy". Marasigan criticized Praybeyt Benjamin for "unashamedly made for profit". He also described the film as "cheap, tacky and absolutely nonsensical. But say what you might about the film's level of intellectualism (or lack thereof), it is at least honest about its intentions". Marasigan however acknowledged that the film fulfilled its purpose, to primarily entertain its target audience.

Bubbles Salvador at the Philippine Entertainment Portal, has a more positive review for the film. While Salvador took note of one loophole in the plot of the film - namely the lack of resolution between Bimbee and his father, with the former feeling unloved by the latter, Salvador described Praybeyt Benjamin 2 as "worth of one's couple of hours at the cinema this holiday season, if one is not looking for a lesson in history, a love story, or a good scare, and would settle for a light and funny action comedy".

Planned sequel
A third film was announced as it is officially part of the 46th Metro Manila Film Festival. Vice Ganda was expected to reprise his role. Its entry in the film festival was based on its script. Filming for the Praybeyt Benjamin sequel has yet to take place as of October 2020 due to logistics issue caused by the COVID-19 pandemic as well as uncertainties caused by the non-renewal of ABS-CBN's broadcast franchise. As a script-based submission, the Praybeyt Benjamin film would have to be produced by November 30, 2020. The film was not among the final ten official entries of the film festival announced in November 2020 . As of 2022, no  further updates for the film and later both will be starring on upcoming MMFF 2022 film called Partners in Crime.

References

External links
 

2014 films
Philippine Christmas films
2010s fantasy comedy films
Philippine fantasy comedy films
Philippine sequel films
Star Cinema films
Viva Films films
Films set in Metro Manila
Films directed by Wenn V. Deramas
Philippine parody films
2010s Christmas films
2010s parody films
Films about terrorism in Asia
Zombie comedy films
Philippine LGBT-related films
2014 LGBT-related films